Amphomycin is an antibiotic with the molecular formula C58H91N13O20 which is produced by the bacterium Streptomyces canus.

References

Further reading 

 
 
 
 

Antimicrobial peptides
Pyrrolidines
Carboxylic acids